USS Charles P. Crawford (SP-366) was a United States Navy minesweeper and tug in commission from 1917 to 1919.
 
Charles P. Crawford was built as a commercial tug of the same name in 1915 by the Staten Island Shipbuilding Company in New York City, for the Erie Railroad Company, New York City. On 8 May 1917, the U.S. Navy chartered her for use as a minesweeper and tug during World War I. She was commissioned on 22 September 1917 as USS Charles P. Crawford (SP-366).

Assigned to the 3rd Naval District, Charles P. Crawford performed minesweeping, towing, and general transportation duties in the New York City area for the remainder of World War I and into 1919.

The Navy returned Charles P. Crawford to the Erie Railroad Company on 12 August 1919.

References

Department of the Navy Naval History and Heritage Command Online Library of Selected Images: Civilian Ships: Charles P. Crawford (American Harbor Tug, 1915). Served as USS Charles P. Crawford (SP-366) in 1917–1919
NavSource Online: Section Patrol Craft Photo Archive: Charles P. Crawford (SP 366)

Minesweepers of the United States Navy
Auxiliary ships of the United States Navy
World War I minesweepers of the United States
World War I auxiliary ships of the United States
Ships built in Staten Island
1915 ships